Sloop Point Plantation is a historic house located at Sloop Point, Pender County, North Carolina.  It was built in 1729 according to dendrochronological dating and is possibly the oldest surviving framed building in the state of North Carolina.  The house was built as a home for John Baptista Ashe and his wife Elizabeth Swann Ashe.

The building was added to the National Register of Historic Places in 1972.

See also
List of the oldest buildings in North Carolina

References

External links

Historic American Buildings Survey in North Carolina
Plantation houses in North Carolina
Houses on the National Register of Historic Places in North Carolina
Houses completed in 1729
Houses in Pender County, North Carolina
National Register of Historic Places in Pender County, North Carolina
1729 establishments in the Thirteen Colonies